Belvidere, also known as the Boyd House, is a historic plantation house located near Williamsboro, Vance County, North Carolina.  It is attributed to architect Jacob W. Holt and built about 1850.  It is a two-story, double-pile frame Greek Revival / Italianate style frame dwelling.  It has a high hipped roof with bracketed eaves.  The front facade features a full-width porch with hipped roof and brackets.  Also on the property is a contributing one-story, heavy timber-frame school house (c. 1850).

It was listed on the National Register of Historic Places in 1992.

References

Plantation houses in North Carolina
Houses on the National Register of Historic Places in North Carolina
Greek Revival houses in North Carolina
Italianate architecture in North Carolina
Houses completed in 1850
Houses in Vance County, North Carolina
National Register of Historic Places in Vance County, North Carolina